Loxaulax is a genus of extinct mammal from the Lower Cretaceous of southern England. It was a member of the also extinct order Multituberculata, and lived alongside the dinosaurs. It lies within the suborder "Plagiaulacida" and family Eobaataridae. The genus Loxaulax was named by Simpson G.G. in 1928 based on one species.

Fossil remains of the species Loxaulax valdensis consist of a tooth found in Valanginian (Lower Cretaceous) strata belong to the Wadhurst Clay Formation of the Cliff End bonebed in Hastings, England. More recently, "Butler and Ford reported some IoW (Isle of Wight) Wealden mammal teeth several decades ago from the Wessex Formation. They identified one of the teeth as belonging to the multituberculate Loxaulax but weren't sure about the others. Other IoW Wealden mammal teeth have been found since but have yet to be written up," (with thanks to Darren Naish).

Representatives from the Isle of Wight Museum say that sieving is underway at one fossil location. This suggests new mammal finds are not unlikely.

Fossil remains of the species Loxaulax herreroi were found in the Barremian-age Camarillas Formation of Galve, Spain.

References
 Simpson (1928), A catalogue of the Mesozoic mammalia in the geological department of the British Museum. London: British Museum (Nat Hist).
 Kielan-Jaworowska Z & Hurum JH (2001), "Phylogeny and Systematics of multituberculate mammals". Paleontology 44, p. 389-429.

External links
 Mesozodic Mammals: Plagiaulacidae, Albionbaataridae, Eobaataridae & Arginbaataridae

Multituberculates
Early Cretaceous mammals of Europe
Barremian life
Cretaceous Spain
Fossils of Spain
Cretaceous England
Fossils of England
Camarillas Formation
Prehistoric mammal genera